The 2020 Brunei Super League was the seventh season of the Brunei Super League, the top Bruneian professional league for association football clubs, since its establishment in 2012. The season began on 28 January.

This season saw the expansion of the league to 16 teams, who were selected through a vetting process. All ten teams from the previous campaign were retained, including Najip FC who are now called BAKES FC. Meanwhile, teams from the 2018-19 Brunei Premier League are DPMM FC II, Tabuan FC, BSRC FC, Panchor Murai FC and Rimba Star FC. Kuala Belait FC were also included as winners of the Belait District football tournament. Shortly after the announcement of the teams, Lun Bawang FC was replaced by Jerudong FC. 

On 13 March, the NFABD announced that the league would be suspended indefinitely, due to the ongoing COVID-19 pandemic.

On 19 September, NFABD announced the cancellation of the league.

Teams
 BAKES FC
 BSRC FC
 DPMM FC II
 IKLS-MB5 FC
 Indera SC
 Jerudong FC
 Kasuka FC
 KB FC
 Kota Ranger FC
 MS ABDB
 MS PPDB
 Panchor Murai FC
 Rimba Star FC
 Setia Perdana FC
 Tabuan FC
 Wijaya FC

Foreign Players

Note: MS ABDB (Royal Brunei Armed Forces), MS PPDB (Royal Brunei Police Force) and Tabuan (Brunei national under-21 football team) do not field foreigners

League table

See also
2020 Brunei FA Cup

References

External links
National Football Association of Brunei Darussalam website 

Brunei Super League seasons
Brunei
Brunei Super League, 2020